Haunted House is an arcade game released in 1972 by Midway Manufacturing Company.

Description
Haunted House is a Dale Gun style rifle game.

Features
Four Targets
x2 Cats
x1 Witch
x1 Grave Robber
3-Dimensional Playfield
Backlight lighting
Gun Recoil
Adaptive Difficulty

Sound effects
Haunted House uses a special 4-channel 8-track player to produce background music and sound effects. The background sound plays continually, but the player momentarily changes tracks for the appropriate target hit.

See also
Arcade game
Haunted House Pinball

References

Games and sports introduced in 1972
Arcade games
Midway video games